Ernest Moss Tipton (January 2, 1889 – February 25, 1955) was an American judge and college sports coach. He served on the Supreme Court of Missouri for 22 years, from 1933 until his death in 1955. Tipton was the head football coach at Westminster College in Fulton, Missouri from 1911 to 1912, Texas Christian University (TCU) in 1918, and East Texas State Normal College—now known as the Texas A&M University–Commerce in 1919. He was also the head basketball coach at East Texas State for one season, in 1919–20.

Tipton was born on January 2, 1889, in Bowling Green, Missouri. He attended the University of Missouri, where ran track and graduated with the law class of 1911. In 1932, Tipton was elected to succeeded Berryman Henwood on the Missouri high court, taking office in 1933. He died on February 25, 1955, in Kansas City, Missouri.

Head coaching record

Football

See also
 List of judges of the Supreme Court of Missouri

References

External links
 

1889 births
1955 deaths
20th-century American judges
American male middle-distance runners
Chief Justices of the Supreme Court of Missouri
Missouri Democrats
Missouri Tigers men's track and field athletes
TCU Horned Frogs athletic directors
TCU Horned Frogs football coaches
Texas A&M–Commerce Lions football coaches
Texas A&M–Commerce Lions men's basketball coaches
Westminster Blue Jays football coaches
People from Bowling Green, Missouri
Coaches of American football from Missouri
Basketball coaches from Missouri
Track and field athletes from Missouri